Axel Proet Høst (1907 – 1985) was a Norwegian sports official. He was president of the Norwegian Boxing Association from 1938 to 1949. He was president of the Norwegian Confederation of Sports from 1961 to 1965.

He served as høyesterettssakfører (high court lawyer) in Horten, in southern Norway.  During World War II, he was a leader of the local resistance to the Nazi occupation, then narrowly escaped to Britain to continue the fight, while the occupiers imprisoned his wife.

References

1907 births
1985 deaths
Norwegian sports executives and administrators